Hon. Arthur Cole-Hamilton (born Cole; 8 August 1750 – 1810) was an Anglo-Irish politician who sat in the Irish House of Commons for Fermanagh and Enniskillen. After the Acts of Union 1800, he sat in British House of Commons for Enniskillen.

Cole-Hamilton was the second son of John Cole, 1st Baron Mountflorence (1709–1767) of Florencecourt, County Fermanagh, and his wife, Elizabeth Montgomery. His elder brother was William Cole, 1st Earl of Enniskillen.

In 1780, he married Letitia Hamilton, daughter and heiress of Claud Hamilton, MP in the Irish Parliament, and appended her surname. They had one surviving son and three daughters:
Claud William Cole-Hamilton (1781–1822), High Sheriff of Tyrone in 1811, married Nichola Sophia Chaloner
Letitia Cole-Hamilton (5 January 1782 – 1853), married Major Randall Stafford 
Elizabeth Ann Cole-Hamilton (October 1785 – 1849), married Henry Slade
Isabella Cole-Hamilton (October 1788 – 1827)

Through his son Claud he was an ancestor of the clergyman Richard Cole-Hamilton, the RAF officer John Cole-Hamilton and the politician Alex Cole-Hamilton.

References 

1750 births
1810 deaths
Irish Anglicans
19th-century Irish people
Politicians from County Fermanagh
UK MPs 1801–1802
Members of the Parliament of the United Kingdom for County Fermanagh constituencies (1801–1922)